is a Japanese actress. She first attracted attention after landing a role in a television series, Here Comes Asa on NHK in 2016. She received the Elan d'or Award for Newcomer of the Year in 2018.

She won the Newcomer of the Year Award at the 43rd Japan Academy Film Prize for her role in the 2019 film Mienai Mokugeki-sha and Parallel world love story.

Filmography

Films

Television drama

Others
68th NHK Kōhaku Uta Gassen (2017), judge
62nd Japan Record Awards (2020), host
63rd Japan Record Awards (2021), host

Awards

References

External links
 
 
 
 Official profile 

1993 births
Living people
Actresses from Kyoto
21st-century Japanese actresses
Japanese gravure models